Jonas Kendall (October 27, 1757October 22, 1844) was a U.S. Representative from Massachusetts, father of Joseph Gowing Kendall.

Born in Leominster in the Province of Massachusetts Bay, Kendall pursued an academic course. He engaged in the manufacture of paper in Leominster, Massachusetts, in 1796.
He served as a member of the Massachusetts House of Representatives in 1800, 1801 from 1803 to 1807, and 1821, and in the Massachusetts Senate from 1808 to 1811. He served as a member of the school board in 1803, 1811, and 1814 and as a member of the executive council in 1822. He was a presidential elector on the Federalist ticket in 1816.

Kendall was elected as a Federalist to the Sixteenth Congress (March 4, 1819 – March 3, 1821). He was an unsuccessful candidate for reelection in 1820 to the Seventeenth Congress. He resumed the manufacture of paper.

He died in Leominster, Massachusetts and was interred in Evergreen Cemetery.

References

1757 births
1844 deaths
People from Leominster, Massachusetts
Members of the Massachusetts House of Representatives
Massachusetts state senators
Federalist Party members of the United States House of Representatives from Massachusetts